Wellsted is a surname. Notable people with the surname include:

 James Raymond Wellsted (1805–1842), lieutenant in the Indian navy.
 Raife Wellsted (1929–2012), British philatelist.
 Sophie Matilda Wellsted, mother of Kate Marsden (1859-1931), British missionary, explorer, writer and nursing heroine